Stu Williamson (May 14, 1933 – October 1, 1991) was an American jazz trumpeter and valve trombonist. Born in Brattleboro, Vermont, Williamson was the younger brother of jazz pianist Claude Williamson.

In 1949, he moved to Los Angeles, where he worked with Stan Kenton, Woody Herman, Billy May, Charlie Barnet, and Shelly Manne. He worked often as a session musician until his retirement in 1968. He battled drug addiction for much of his life and died in Studio City, California in 1991.

Discography

As leader
 Sapphire (Bethlehem, 1955)
 Stu Williamson Plays (Bethlehem, 1955)
 A Jazz Band Ball with Jack Sheldon (Bethlehem, 1957)
 Stu Williamson (Bethlehem, 1958)

As sideman or guest
With Pepper Adams
Pepper Adams Quintet (Mode, 1956)

With Clifford Brown's All Stars
Jazz Messages 
Jazz Immortal (Pacific Jazz, 1956)
With Benny Carter
Aspects (United Artists, 1959)
With Terry Gibbs
 Dream Band recorded 1959 (Contemporary, 1986) 
 The Dream Band, Vol. 2: The Sundown Sessions recorded 1959 (Contemporary, 1987) 
 Dream Band, Vol. 3: Flying Home recorded 1959 (Contemporary, 1988) 
 The Exciting Terry Gibbs Big Band (Verve, 1961); reissued as Dream Band, Vol. 4: Main Stem (Contemporary, 1990)

With Dizzy Gillespie
The New Continent (Limelight, 1962)

With Elmo Hope
The Elmo Hope Quintet featuring Harold Land (Pacific Jazz, 1957)

With Stan Kenton
This Modern World (Capitol, 1953)
Kenton Showcase (Capitol, 1954)
The Kenton Era (Capitol, 1940–54, [1955])
Contemporary Concepts (Capitol, 1955)
The Innovations Orchestra (Capitol, 1950-51 [1997])

With Shelly Manne
Swinging Sounds (Contemporary, 1956)
More Swinging Sounds (Contemporary, 1956)
Concerto for Clarinet & Combo (Contemporary, 1957)
The Gambit (Contemporary, 1958)
Manne–That's Gershwin! (Capitol, 1965)

With Jack Montrose
Arranged by Montrose (Pacific Jazz, 1954)

With Lennie Niehaus
 Volume 1: The Quintets (Contemporary, 1955)
 Volume 2: The Octet, No. 1 (Contemporary, 1955)
 Volume 3: The Octet, No. 2 (Contemporary, 1956)
 Volume 4: The Quintets and Strings (Contemporary, 1956)
 Volume 5: The Sextet  (Contemporary, 1957)

With Shorty Rogers
An Invisible Orchard (RCA Victor, 1961 [1997])

With Pete Rugolo
The Music from Richard Diamond (EmArcy, 1959)

With Howard Rumsey's Lighthouse All Stars
Lighthouse All Stars vol. 6 (Contemporary, 1955)
In the Solo Spotlight (Contemporary, 1955)

With Bud Shank
Strings & Trombones (Pacific Jazz, 1955)

With Zoot Sims
Quintet (Prestige, 1955) reissue Good Old Zoot (Status, 1965) (Prestige, 1970)

With Duane Tatro
Jazz for Moderns (Contemporary, 1956)

References

1933 births
1991 deaths
American jazz trombonists
Male trombonists
American jazz trumpeters
American male trumpeters
American session musicians
Musicians from Vermont
People from Brattleboro, Vermont
20th-century American musicians
20th-century trombonists
20th-century trumpeters
20th-century American male musicians
American male jazz musicians